The color red orange may refer to:
 Vermilion, a brilliant red or scarlet color
 Red-orange, a Crayola color
 Orange-red, a web color
 Red orange (RAL), a RAL Classic color